"Lost Verizon" is the second episode of the twentieth season of the American animated television series The Simpsons. It first aired on the Fox network in the United States on October 5, 2008 and in the United Kingdom on November 9, 2008. Bart becomes jealous of his friends and their cell phones. Working at a golf course, Bart takes the cell phone of Denis Leary after the star comedian throws it away in anger. Marge, per Leary's advice, activates the GPS system on the phone to track down Bart's every move; catching on, Bart attaches the GPS chip to a bird that migrates to Machu Picchu, Peru. Leary and Brian Grazer (who also appeared in "When You Dish Upon a Star" as himself) both guest star as themselves. It was directed by Raymond S. Persi and written by John Frink.

Plot
When Principal Skinner makes a fool of himself on a freeway, Milhouse manages to catch the scene on his cell phone. He calls most of his friends to see Skinner getting beaten up by a drunken-(as-always) Barney, but cannot call Bart, who does not have a cell phone and is immediately taunted for missing out on laughing at Skinner. Bart asks Marge for a phone; Marge explains that, because Mr. Burns has cut Homer's pay, forcing him to work for free, she cannot afford it, nor a dream trip for Lisa to Machu Picchu. A depressed Bart takes a walk past the Springfield Glen Country Club, and is hit by a golf ball. He angrily runs onto the golf course to find who hit him, and finds it was Dr. Julius Hibbert. Hibbert pays Bart a dollar for the retrieval and says golf balls can cost $5 new. Bart tries to enough money for a cell phone by retrieving golf balls until Groundskeeper Willie accuses Bart of cutting in on his job, and confiscates all the golf balls.

At a nearby celebrity golf tournament, Denis Leary (guest starring as himself) prepares to swing, but misses when his cell phone rings at the same time. Leary throws away his phone, which lands beside Bart. While going to inform Milhouse of his new cell, Bart receives a call from producer Brian Grazer (also guest starring as himself), who asks Leary to star in the film adaption of Everyone Poops. Bart, realizing the phone belongs to Leary, pretends to be him and accepts the role. He makes prank calls to bartenders all over the world, and has all of Boston native Leary's money spent on New York Yankees hats and uniforms. Marge overhears Bart and Milhouse's mischievousness, and when Milhouse confesses that it belongs to Leary, she confiscates and prepares to return Bart's phone to him. Leary calls his cell, and Marge answers, apologizing for her son's behavior. Leary, still angry with Bart's tricks, suggests Marge activate the GPS and web filter on the phone and return it to Bart, allowing her to track down Bart's every move and block certain websites. Somewhat guiltily, Marge activates the GPS and returns the phone to Bart, and she is able to prevent him from watching R-rated movies, gambling, grave-digging, and skating down steps and hurting himself.

Bart soon realizes that he cannot have any fun when Marge and Homer have him under constant surveillance. Lisa discovers her parents spying on Bart and shocked by Marge's injustice, confronts her for it. When Marge refuses to acknowledge she is abusing Bart's privacy (unaware that Moe Szyslak is spying on her as well, who in turn is being secretly monitored by two FBI agents), Lisa informs Bart, who gets revenge by uninstalling the phone's parental control software and tying the GPS chip to the leg of a scarlet tanager, which flies away. Marge, thinking the bird is Bart, assumes that Bart is running away from home. While Homer, Lisa, Marge, and Maggie conduct a nationwide search for Bart, Lisa realizes that the bird is what they had been chasing. After checking research on her laptop, she discovers the bird is migrating to Machu Picchu, her dream trip they could not afford. Knowing this, Lisa deliberately lets the bird go free so the family can chase it to Machu Picchu.

Bart relishes his newfound freedom during the daytime, but quickly becomes frightened of being alone at night. When the Simpsons arrive in Machu Picchu, they continue the search for Bart. Marge, despite being exhausted, swears to be more over-protective with Bart, but Lisa convinces her to rest on an ancient sculpture, below the statue of the ancient Peruvian God of the Sky. Marge quickly falls asleep, and is instantaneously pulled into a dream world where the God of the Sky shows her ancient Peru. He teaches her how throughout history, parents who over-parented their children could never set them free, which was how they were conquered by the Conquistadors and Inca renegades (although historical-wise, Machu Picchu was never actually discovered or conquered by the Conquistadors). Upon waking, Marge learns that she must let Bart learn how to take care of himself. Homer discovers that the family has been following a bird the whole time, making Marge to realize where Bart is. Upon returning to Springfield, Marge asks Bart if he missed her. Bart says he did not notice they were gone (for two weeks), so Marge, depressed, goes upstairs. However, upon reaching the stairs, she is stopped by Bart, who quickly begs her to never leave again. The episode ends with Lisa and Homer realizing that they left Maggie in Machu Picchu, where she is being worshipped.

Production
During the table read of the script, a role meant for Matt Damon was included, but he did not appear in the final version of the episode. The episode was "Dedicated to the memory of Paul Newman", who guest starred in "The Blunder Years" and died nine days before the episode aired.

Cultural references
The Swedish and Australian bars which Bart prank calls feature numerous references. The Swedish bar is named the "Inga-Bar Beerman" in reference to filmmaker Ingmar Bergman. The image of the barman in profile and another person in the background looking directly into the camera is a visual reference to Bergman's 1966 film Persona. The Australian barman resembles Michael "Crocodile" Dundee, and his bar is called the "Crocodile Drunkee's", both referencing the 1986 film "Crocodile" Dundee. In his bar window, a partial sticker for the band INXS is seen, as well as the album Business as Usual by Men at Work. The zoom-in places the Australian bar at Fox Studios Australia.

Additionally, Skinner plays a human version of the arcade game Frogger when trying to cross the interstate for gas. Marge receives a collection notice from Allied Peas whose corporate mascot bears a striking resemblance to the Jolly Green Giant while paying for frozen peas on installment, while Bart, Milhouse, and Nelson grill Twizzlers licorice. Bart suggests to Leary's manager that he order New York Yankees hats and Derek Jeter jerseys. Leary is a real life Boston Red Sox fan, a large rival of the Yankees. Leary was born in Massachusetts and went to college at Emerson College in Boston.

The episode features two musical montages. During the montage of Homer and Marge tracking Bart the Elvis Costello song "Watch Your Step" is playing, while Bart's golf ball recovery montage is set to Merle Haggard's "Workin' Man Blues".

The title is also a reference to the telecommunications company Verizon Communications, and the novel and film Lost Horizon.

Reception
In its original airing, the episode garnered 7.43 million viewers, a 3.6 rating and a 10 share.

Robert Canning of IGN said, "This wasn't a terrible episode, but it just was not funny enough for such a serpentine storyline. Throw in a wasted Denis Leary, and you really start to think that 'Lost Verizon' could have been so much more". He gave the episode a final rating of 6.7/10.

Erich Asperschlager of TV Verdict said, "it is a mostly solid episode, it feels like a missed opportunity for a show that garners more grumbles than acclaim these days".

References

External links 
 

The Simpsons (season 20) episodes
2008 American television episodes
Television episodes set in Peru
Verizon Communications